Colin Francis Douglas (9 September 1962) is a former Scottish footballer who played as a centre forward and right back for Doncaster Rovers and Rotherham United. He is second in the list of players who have made the appearances in all competitions for Doncaster behind James Coppinger.

Playing career

Youth
Douglas attended St Joseph's Academy in Kilmarnock. He began as wing half playing for Kilmarnock Colts, then in February 1977 moving to Ayr United. He was at Bellfield Boys Club before moving to Celtic in 1980.

Celtic
His first senior club was Celtic, then managed by Billy McNeil. He only played one game for them on 6 October 1980 in the semi final of the Glasgow Cup against Queen's Park where he scored his first senior goal in the 76th minute in a 2–0 victory.

Doncaster Rovers (1st period)
In summer 1981 he was signed by manager Billy Bremner of Doncaster, coming on as substitute to play his first match on 5 September in a 2–2 draw against Bristol City at Ashton Gate in Division 3. He scored his first goal 10 days later in a 1–1 draw at Chesterfield in the League Cup. As a 20-year-old, he went on to score 5 goals in 49 appearances that first season. In 1985, he was a member of the Rovers side that beat then high flying QPR in the third round of the FA Cup. His time at the club ended after an incident on the team coach with manager Dave Cusack.

Rotherham United
Initially on loan, Douglas started up front for the Millers, then moved to playing full back following an injury.

Doncaster Rovers (2nd period)
He was brought back to Doncaster in 1988 by manager Dave Mackay. "Duggie" was famed for his "never say die" attitude, and was named player of the year for the 3rd time in 1991. He ended his career at Doncaster with a record of 468 appearances (444 starts) in all competitions.

Later career
He moved to Bridlington Town who played their Northern Premier League Premier Division home games that season at Doncaster Rovers Belle Vue ground, and then on to be player manager of Armthorpe Welfare and Hatfield Main before returning to Armthorpe as a player in July 2002.

References

External links
Colin Douglas at DoncasterRovers.co.uk

1962 births
Association football forwards
Association football defenders
Doncaster Rovers F.C. players
Rotherham United F.C. players
Armthorpe Welfare F.C. players
Hatfield Main F.C. players
Hatfield Main F.C. managers
English Football League players
Living people
People educated at Saint Joseph's Academy, Kilmarnock
Scottish footballers
Footballers from East Ayrshire
Celtic F.C. players
Scottish football managers